Hyperkeratotic hand dermatitis presents with hyperkeratotic, fissure-prone, erythematous areas of the middle or proximal palm, and the volar surfaces of the fingers may also be involved.

See also
Skin lesion
 List of cutaneous conditions

References

Eczema